Eucalyptus × tokwa is a species of tree that is endemic to Queensland. Eucalyptus tokwa was first formally described in 1987 by Denis John Carr and Stella Grace Maisie Carr from specimens collected "about 6 km from Tokwa on [the] old road from Morehead, Western District, Papua-New Guinea". The description was published in  Eucalyptus II - The rubber cuticle, and other studies of the Corymbosae. In 1995, Ken Hill and Lawrie Johnson suggested that E. × tokwa is a hybrid between Corymbia latifolia and C. novoguinensis and that interpretation is accepted by the Australian Plant Census.

References

x tokwa
Myrtales of Australia
Flora of Queensland
Plants described in 1987
Plant nothospecies
Taxa named by Maisie Carr